Ferry Sikla (born Ferry Sykla; 11 March 1865 – 8 February 1932) was a German stage and film actor. He appeared in more than fifty films from 1914 to 1931.

Selected filmography

References

External links 

1865 births
1932 deaths
German male stage actors
German male film actors
German male silent film actors
20th-century German male actors
Male actors from Hamburg